"The Adventure of the Copper Beeches", one of the 56 short Sherlock Holmes stories written by Sir Arthur Conan Doyle, is the last of the twelve collected in The Adventures of Sherlock Holmes. It was first published in The Strand Magazine in June 1892.

Plot summary
Violet Hunter visits Holmes, asking whether she should accept a job as governess—a job with extraordinary conditions. She is enticed by the phenomenal salary which, as originally offered, is £100 a year, later increased to £120 when Miss Hunter balks at having to cut her long copper-coloured hair short (her previous position paid £48 a year). This is only one of many peculiar provisos to which she must agree. The employer, Jephro Rucastle, seems pleasant enough, yet Miss Hunter obviously has her suspicions.

She announces to Holmes, after the raised salary offer, that she will take the job, and Holmes suggests that if he is needed, a telegram will bring him to Hampshire, where Mr. Rucastle's country estate, the Copper Beeches, is situated.

After a fortnight, Holmes receives such a message, beseeching him to come and see her in Winchester. Miss Hunter tells them one of the most singular stories that they have ever heard. Mr. Rucastle would sometimes have Miss Hunter wear a particular electric blue dress and sit in the front room reading, with her back to the front window. She began to suspect that she was not supposed to see something outside the window, and a small mirror shard hidden in her handkerchief showed her that she was right: a man was standing there on the road looking towards the house.

At another such session, Mr. Rucastle told a series of funny stories that made Miss Hunter laugh until she was quite weary. The one astonishing thing about this was that Mrs. Rucastle not only did not laugh but did not even smile.

There were other unsavoury things about the household. The six-year-old child that she was supposed to look after was astonishingly cruel to small animals. The servants, Mr. and Mrs. Toller, were quite a sour pair. A great mastiff was kept on the property and always kept hungry. It was let out to prowl the grounds at night, and Miss Hunter was warned not to cross the threshold after dark. Also, Mr. Toller, who was quite often drunk, was the only one who had control over the dog.

There was also the odd discovery by Miss Hunter of what appeared to be her own tresses in a locked drawer. Upon checking her own luggage, however, they turned out to be another woman's, but identical in every way to Miss Hunter's, even to the unusual colour.

However, the most disturbing thing of all about the household was the mystery wing. Miss Hunter had observed a part of the house that did not seem to be used. The windows were either dirty or shuttered, and once she saw Mr. Rucastle coming out of the door leading into the wing looking most perturbed. Later, he explained that he used the rooms as a photographic darkroom, but Miss Hunter was not convinced.

When he is drunk, Mr. Toller leaves the keys in the door to the mystery wing. Miss Hunter sneaks in. She finds the place spooky, and when she spots a shadow moving on the other side of a locked door, she panics and runs out into Mr. Rucastle's waiting arms. Mr. Rucastle does not reproach her; instead, he pretends to comfort her. However, he overdoes his act and alerts her suspicions, causing her to claim that she saw nothing. In an instant, his expression changes from comfort to rage.

With the great detective's aid, it is discovered that someone has been kept a prisoner in the forbidden wing. The purpose of hiring Miss Hunter becomes clear: her presence is to convince the man watching from the road that Rucastle's daughter Alice, previously unknown to Miss Hunter and whom she resembles, is no longer interested in seeing him.

Holmes, Watson, and Miss Hunter find Miss Rucastle's secret room empty; Rucastle arrives and thinks the trio has helped his daughter escape and goes to fetch the mastiff to set upon the trespassers. Unfortunately for Rucastle, the dog has been accidentally starved for longer than usual and attacks him instead. Watson shoots the dog with his revolver. Later, Mrs. Toller confirms Holmes' theory about Rucastle's daughter and reveals that when Alice came of age, she was to receive an annuity from her late mother's will; Rucastle tried to force his daughter to sign control of the inheritance over to him, which only resulted in Alice becoming ill with brain fever; hence, the cut hair. Rucastle then tried to keep Alice away from her fiancé by locking her up in the mystery wing and hiring Miss Hunter to impersonate Alice.

Rucastle's daughter escapes with her fiancé, and they marry soon after. Watson notes that Holmes appears to have been drawn to Miss Hunter. However, to his disappointment, Holmes does not show any interest in Miss Hunter after the mystery has been solved, which was the real force behind his feelings. Rucastle survives as an invalid, kept alive solely by his second wife. Miss Hunter later becomes principal of a girls' school, where she meets with "considerable success."

Publication history
"The Adventure of the Copper Beeches" was first published in the UK in The Strand Magazine in June 1892, and in the United States in the US edition of the Strand in July 1892. The story was published with nine illustrations by Sidney Paget in The Strand Magazine. It was included in the short story collection The Adventures of Sherlock Holmes, which was published in October 1892.

Adaptations

Film and television

The story was adapted as the short film The Copper Beeches (1912), starring Georges Tréville and directed, though uncredited, by Adrien Caillard, as part of the Éclair film series. The Copper Beeches (1912) was one of a series of eight silent film adaptations of the Holmes stories that were actually supervised by Conan Doyle.  It is the only one that has survived.  It is altered in several respects. Instead of beginning with Ms Hunter's visit to Baker Street to tell her story, it starts with Rucastle trying to force his daughter to sign away her rights to her fortune, and then ordering her fiancé off his property. Rucastle subsequently locks up his daughter.  The film only has Holmes (no Watson), and there is no appearance of Mrs Rucastle nor the servants. Nor is there any mastiff hound. The scheme of why Rucastle wants Ms Hunter to trim her hair and stand by the window is the same, but the motive is different: Rucastle seeking to lure the fiancé back so he can pretend he shot him as a trespasser. In the end Holmes and the police capture Rucastle, and the daughter and her fiancé are united.

Another short film adaptation, The Copper Beeches (1921), was released as part of the Stoll film series starring Eille Norwood.

The story was adapted as "The Copper Beeches", a 1965 episode of Sherlock Holmes starring Douglas Wilmer as Holmes, Nigel Stock as Watson, Suzanne Neve as Violet Hunter and Patrick Wymark as Jephro Rucastle.

"The Copper Beeches" is a 1985 episode of The Adventures of Sherlock Holmes starring Jeremy Brett as Sherlock Holmes, with Natasha Richardson as Miss Hunter and Joss Ackland as Rucastle.

Radio
"The Copper Beeches" was adapted by Edith Meiser as an episode of the radio series The Adventures of Sherlock Holmes. The episode aired on 17 November 1930, with Richard Gordon as Sherlock Holmes and Leigh Lovell as Dr. Watson. Another radio dramatisation of the story aired on 5 May 1935 (with Louis Hector as Holmes and Lovell as Watson). Meiser also adapted the story as an episode of The New Adventures of Sherlock Holmes with Basil Rathbone as Holmes and Nigel Bruce as Watson. The episode aired on 6 October 1940. Other dramatisations of the story aired on 7 May 1943 (again with Rathbone and Bruce) and in November 1947 (with John Stanley as Holmes and Alfred Shirley as Watson).

The story was adapted by Felix Felton as a radio production that aired on the BBC Light Programme in 1955, as part of the 1952–1969 radio series starring Carleton Hobbs as Holmes and Norman Shelley as Watson.

An adaptation aired on BBC radio in 1978, starring Barry Foster as Holmes and David Buck as Watson. It was adapted by Michael Bakewell.

"The Copper Beeches" was dramatised by Peter Mackie for BBC Radio 4 in 1991 as an episode of the 1989–1998 radio series starring Clive Merrison as Holmes and Michael Williams as Watson. It featured Roger Hammond as Jephro Rucastle and Imogen Stubbs as Violet Hunter.

The story was adapted as a 2015 episode of the radio series The Classic Adventures of Sherlock Holmes, with John Patrick Lowrie as Holmes and Lawrence Albert as Watson.

Print

Peter Cannon has pointed to parallels between "The Adventure of the Copper Beeches" and H. P. Lovecraft's story "The Picture in the House".

In Sherlock Holmes's War of the Worlds, Violet Hunter becomes the second wife of Dr. Watson mentioned in "The Adventure of the Blanched Soldier".

References
Notes

Sources

External links 

1892 short stories
Copper Beeches
Works originally published in The Strand Magazine
Articles containing video clips
Short stories adapted into films